The Norwegian Poultry Association is the largest Norwegian professional association for poultry farming, with approximately 950 members organised into 12 regional teams as of 2018.

History 
The Norwegian Poultry Association was founded on 27 June 1884 as the Norwegian Poultry Breeding Association.

The association's first concern after formation was improving the quality of the Norwegian chicken stock, and began to import chickens from abroad.

21st Century 
In November 2019, the association attributed a decline in the consumption of white meat in Norway to a rise in vegetarianism.

Ingunn Dalaker Øderud became the association's first female chairperson in March 2021, succeeding Kolbjørn Frøseth.

In May 2020, the association called for economic support from the Minister of Agriculture and Food for poultry farmers in response to the COVID-19 pandemic.

References

External links 

 

1884 establishments in Norway
Organisations based in Oslo
Agriculture in Norway
Poultry farming